Sparadocos (Ancient Greek, Σπαράδοκος) was a king of the Odrysian kingdom of Thrace from ca. 450 BC to before 431 BC, succeeding his father, Teres I.

Family
His son was:
 Seuthes I.

References

See also
List of Thracian tribes
 
5th-century BC rulers
Odrysian kings